Gulsumbi Sharifova (born 2 December 1997) is a Tajikistani athlete. She competed in the women's 200 metres event at the 2019 World Athletics Championships. She did not advance to compete in the semi-finals.

References

External links

1997 births
Living people
Tajikistani female sprinters
Place of birth missing (living people)
World Athletics Championships athletes for Tajikistan